Manchester Airport station is a railway, tram, bus and coach station at Manchester Airport, England which opened at the same time as the second air terminal in 1993. Manchester Metrolink tram services were extended to the airport in 2014 and operate to Manchester Victoria.

Description
A branch of Manchester Metrolink runs into it. The station platforms are connected by escalator, lift, ramps and an elevated covered walkway (known as the "Sky Link") to the airport terminal buildings in which is a staffed railway ticket office. Throughout the airport complex, the railway station is known as "The Station" and is signposted as such.

History

New platforms
In December 2008, a third platform opened after a year of construction and a total cost of £15 million. The following year Network Rail noted that it had "greatly increased operational flexibility at the station, and reduced the number of times that late-running trains had had to be terminated at Manchester Piccadilly."

In 2009, Network Rail stated that the creation of the third platform has meant that the capacity at Manchester Airport will become constrained by the layover of the trains and congestion at the throat. To solve this issue they have recommended building a line underneath the airport towards Northwich in the 2019 to 2024 period.

In July 2012, support for a fourth railway platform was announced by the Government. The current platforms are eight carriage lengths long, so each can accommodate two trains of four carriages. A fourth platform will allow greater use of longer trains of six carriages or more.  This had been recommended as part of the Northern Hub scheme of rail improvements around Manchester by the 2010 Manchester Hub Rail Study and the 2011 Northern Route Utilisation Strategy, with an estimated cost of £23 million.

In February 2014, construction commenced on a new £20m fourth platform at the station. The start of construction was attended by the Chancellor of the Exchequer, George Osborne. Construction of the new platform was completed in May 2015 - three years earlier than the 2018 estimate given in 2012. This was to allow engineering work to overlap with that being done on the Manchester Metrolink extension to the airport (see below) so that the fourth platform could be used for the extra traffic generated by the Ordsall Chord (opened 10 December 2017), while the fourth platform itself opened to passengers in Autumn 2015.

HS2

In January 2013, the Government announced that Manchester Airport would be included in the second phase of the High Speed 2 railway line. This will enable Manchester Airport to be reached from London Euston in 59 minutes. The new line and associated new station will pass to the west of the Airport, away from the existing railway station and transport interchange, giving the airport two disconnected railways stations approximately 1 mile apart.

National Rail services

The station is managed by TransPennine Express (TPE). All services are operated by TPE, Northern Trains and Transport for Wales (TfW). There are eight trains per hour (tph) to Manchester Piccadilly and beyond, seven of which start and end their journeys here, and the other continues south to Crewe via Wilmslow.

The current off-peak service pattern (as of December 2022) is as follows:

TransPennine Express
1tph to 

Northern Trains
2tph to 
1tph to  via 
1tph to 
1tph to 

Transport for Wales

However the introduction of the May 2018 timetable, one of the most radical in decades, caused punctuality through Manchester to drop sharply and it became common for TransPennine Express to terminate delayed services at Manchester Piccadilly or Victoria rather than continue onto the final destination at Manchester Airport.

Any future additional services to the Airport are in doubt without further infrastructure works; unresolved issues surround the lack of new 'through' platforms at Manchester Piccadilly which have been shelved by the government and the Styal Line to Manchester Airport operating at full capacity with little resilience to absorb delays.

Manchester Metrolink

The Manchester Metrolink light rail network was extended from St Werburgh's Road to Manchester Airport as part of the Phase 3 expansion project. The Metrolink station has been built adjacent to the airport station. It is the terminus of the Airport Line.

Following a period of uncertainty due to funding problems, the plans were finally given the go-ahead in May 2009. The confirmed route would not complete the full airport loop as proposed, but trams would run along the northern route via Wythenshawe. Completion of the western side of the loop is subject to further funding in a later project. An opening date of Summer 2016 had originally been indicated for opening of the Airport line but the line opened early on 3 November 2014.

Services
Trams run between Manchester Airport and Victoria every 12 minutes. An early morning service runs from 03:19–06:00 am every 20 minutes.

Ticket zones 
With the introduction to a zonal ticketing system on Metrolink services in January 2019, Manchester Airport is located within zone 4.

References

External links

National rail

 TransPennine Express Official web site

Metrolink
 Metrolink airport line extension proposals, TfGM
 Metrolink stop information
 Manchester Airport area map
 Manchester Airport Metrolink station plans

1993 establishments in England
Railway stations in Manchester
DfT Category B stations
Railway stations in Great Britain opened in 1993
Airport railway stations in the United Kingdom
Northern franchise railway stations
Railway stations served by TransPennine Express
Railway stations served by Transport for Wales Rail
Tram stops in Manchester
Railway stations opened by British Rail
Manchester Airport